SS Rio de Janeiro was a German cargo steamship, owned by the Hamburg Südamerikanische shipping company and registered in Hamburg. She was  built as Santa Ines in 1914, and renamed Rio de Janeiro in 1921. Until World War II she carried passengers and freight between Germany and South America.

On 7 March 1940 Nazi Germany's Kriegsmarine requisitioned her to carry troops and equipment, before Operation Weserübung, the invasion of Norway and Denmark, began on 9 April 1940.

Building and identification
Bremer Vulkan built Santa Ines, launching her on 3 April 1914 and completing her later that year. She had a single screw, driven by a three-cylinder triple-expansion engine that was rated at 380 NHP.

Hamburg Süd registered the ship in Hamburg. Her code letters were RBVH until 1933–34, when they were superseded by the call sign DHUC.

Invasion of Norway
The secret plan for the ship was to arrive at Bergen immediately after German troops had captured the city. Aboard Rio de Janeiro there was a total of 50 crew and 330 soldiers. Her cargo consisted of six 2 cm FlaK 30 and four 10.5 cm FlaK 38 anti-aircraft guns, 73 horses, 71 vehicles and 292 tons of provisions, animal feed, fuel and ammunition.

Sinking
 (in 1940)
The ship left Stettin on 6 April 1940 at 3 AM. Two days later, at 11.15, less than a day before the attack on Norway began, a surfaced submarine was sighted off Lillesand. At first it was thought to be a German submarine, but it turned out to be the Polish submarine , operating with the British Royal Navy. It had 85 A painted on the tower. The submarine signalled for Rio de Janeiro to stop, which she did. The Polish submarine commander, Lieutenant Jan Grudziński, then ordered the ship to surrender or it would be sunk, but Rio de Janeiro did not reply.

The Polish submarine then torpedoed the ship, which took in water and began sinking. The crew and soldiers on board began to jump into the sea. Grudziński informed the British Admiralty about the sinking of this northbound transport ship with German troops.

At 12.00, an aircraft from the Royal Norwegian Navy Air Service started circling around the sinking ship. At 12.50 the submarine torpedoed the ship a second time, from a submerged position. The torpedo hit the ammunition store, causing an explosion. About 180 men survived the sinking, and were rescued from the sea and taken by local vessels to Lillesand and Kristiansand. About 200 died.

Norwegian authorities notified
Survivors told Norwegian officials that the ship's destination had been Bergen. The fact that there were horses aboard and that many of the dead and survivors were wearing military uniforms, led to alerting of the central authorities. However, the government did not realize that a German invasion was imminent.

The wreck
The exact location of the wreck of Rio de Janeiro was unknown for many years. Fishermen over the years caught parts from the wreck in their fishing nets in this area, and the Royal Norwegian Navy tried to find the wreck.

In June 2015, more than 75 years after the torpedoing, the wreck was finally located by a Norwegian diving company at about  depth off Lillesand. The wreck is considered a war memorial and thus protected by Norwegian law.

References

Literature
 Kristen Taraldsen: Ti i krig, Fædrelandsvennen (1998)  
 Kristen Tallaksen: Da krigen kom til Lillesand. Den dramatiske Torpederingen av Rio de Janeiro 8. April 1940, Fædrelandsvennen (1984)  
 Carl Herbert: Kriegsfahrten deutscher Handelsschiffe. Broschek & Co, Hamburg 1934 .
 Arnold Kludas: Die Schiffe der Hamburg-Süd 1871 bis 1951. Gerhard Stalling Verlag, Oldenburg 1976,

External links
 Den ukjente historien om Rio de Janeiro Stiftelsen Arkivet (The unknown history of the Rio de Janeiro) 

Ships built in Bremen (state)
World War II merchant ships of Germany
World War II auxiliary ships of Germany
Troop ships of Germany
Ships sunk by Polish submarines
World War II shipwrecks in the North Sea
Maritime incidents in April 1940
1914 ships
Lillesand
Cargo liners